Virgilio Senadren Almario (born March 9, 1944), better known by his pen name Rio Alma, is a Filipino author, poet, critic, translator, editor, teacher, and cultural manager. He is a National Artist of the Philippines. He formerly served as the chairman of the Komisyon sa Wikang Filipino (KWF), the government agency mandated to promote and standardize the use of the Filipino language. On January 5, 2017, Almario was also elected as the chairman of the National Commission for Culture and the Arts (NCCA).

Early life and education
Growing up in Bulacan, Almario sought his education at the City of Manila and completed his degree in A.B. Political Science at the University of the Philippines Diliman.

His life as a poet started when he took master's units in education at the University of the East where he became associated with Rogelio G. Mangahas and Lamberto E. Antonio. He did not finish the program.

He only took his M.A. in Filipino in 1974 at the University of the Philippines Diliman.

Career 
A prolific writer, he spearheaded the second successful modernist movement in Filipino poetry together with Mangahas and Antonio. His earliest pieces of literary criticism were collected in Ang Makata sa Panahon ng Makina (1972), now considered the first book of literary criticism in Filipino. Later, in the years of martial law, he set aside modernism and formalism and took interest in nationalism, politics and activist movement. As a critic, his critical works deal with the issue of national language.

Almario campaigned against the usage and proliferation of siyokoy words in the Filipino language, which according to him were improperly derived from English and Spanish. He also advocated the use of Filipinas as the Philippines official name in both Filipino and English languages.

Aside from being a critic, Almario engaged in translating and editing. He has translated the best contemporary poets of the world. He has also translated for theater production the plays of Nick Joaquin, Bertolt Brecht, Euripides and Maxim Gorki. Other important translations include the famous works of the Philippines' national hero, José Rizal, namely Noli Me Tangere and El filibusterismo. For these two, he was awarded the 1999 award for translation by the Manila Critics Circle.

Almario has been a recipient of numerous awards such as several Palanca Awards, two grand prizes from the Cultural Center of the Philippines, the Makata ng Taon of the Komisyon sa Wikang Filipino, the TOYM for literature, and the Southeast Asia Write Award of Bangkok.

He was an instructor at the Lagao Central Elementary School from 1969 to 1972. In 2003, he was appointed Dean of the College of Arts and Letters at the University of the Philippines Diliman. On June 25 of the same year, he was proclaimed National Artist for Literature.

Almario is also the founder and workshop director of the Linangan sa Imahen, Retorika, at Anyo (LIRA), an organization of poets who write in Filipino. Award-winning writers and poets such as Roberto and Rebecca Añonuevo, Romulo Baquiran Jr., Michael Coroza, Jerry Gracio, and Vim Nadera are but some of the products of the LIRA workshop.

He was a founding member of the Gallan sa Arte at Tula (GAT), along with fellow poets Teo Antonio and Mike Bigornia.

Works

Poetry collections
Mga Retrato at Rekwerdo (1984)
Palipad-Hangin. (1985)
Katon Para sa Limang Pandama. (1987)
Sentimental. (2004)
Estremelenggoles. (2004)
Memo Mulang Gimokudan. (2005)
Dust Devils. (2005)
Sonetos Postumos, book of poems with translation by Marne Kilates and paintings by National Artist Ang Kiukok. (2006)
Tatlong Pasyon sa Ating Panahon, poems for children with illustrations by Mark Justiniani, Neil Doloricon, Ferdinand Doctolero. (2006)
Buwan, Buwang, Bulawan. (2009)
UP Diksyunaryong Filipino
Kulo at Kolorum
Baklang Kolorum

Filmography 

 Sariling Gunita (2022), a documentary film directed by Mark Daniel De Castro.

References

External links
Image of Virgilio S. Almario
The Official website of Rio Alma

1944 births
Living people
Academic staff of Ateneo de Manila University
Benigno Aquino III administration personnel
Chairpersons of the Commission on the Filipino Language
Duterte administration personnel
Filipino writers
National Artists of the Philippines
People from San Miguel, Bulacan
University of the East alumni
University of the Philippines alumni
Academic staff of the University of the Philippines
Writers from Bulacan
Tagalog-language writers